Say It with Flowers is a 1934 British musical film directed by John Baxter and starring Mary Clare, Ben Field and George Carney. The screenplay concerns a group of London shopkeepers who hold a benefit concert in a local pub to raise money for a woman to visit the seaside for her health. The film is notable for the performances of several real music hall stars Florrie Forde, Charles Coborn and Marie Kendall.

Synopsis 
The film is set in a street market in the Old Kent Road. One of the stallholders, Kate, is a flower seller who many of the leading music hall stars buy their flowers from. When Kate falls ill and visits the Doctor she is prescribed a stay at the seaside to restore her health. However, she is too ill to work to pay for her visit. Her fellow stallholders rally round, and secretly organise a concert at a nearby pub to help raise the money. They approach all the great musical hall performers (many from the golden era of musical hall) who have used her stall over the years. The concert is successfully staged and Kate is able to head to the seaside.

Cast

Reception 
Picturegoer Weekly reviewed the film favourably observing "there is more entertainment in this unambitous film... than in many alleged super-productions". In his book The Age of the Dream Palace Jeffrey Richards highlighted the film's genuine sympathy with the lives of the ordinary people it is portraying.

References

External links

Bibliography 
 Richards, Jeffrey. The Age of the Dream Palace: Cinema and Society in Britain 1930–1939. Routledge & Kegan Paul. 1984.
 Shafer, Stephen C. British popular films, 1929–1939: The Cinema of Reassurance. Routledge. 1997.

1934 films
British musical films
1934 musical films
1930s English-language films
Films set in London
Films directed by John Baxter
British black-and-white films
1930s British films